"I Hope I Shall Arrive Soon" is  a short story by American writer Philip K. Dick. The short story was first published in Playboy in December 1980, under the title "Frozen Journey".

Plot summary

In the story, a man (Victor Kemmings) regains consciousness during a failed attempt at cryosleep on board a spaceship. The ship's artificial intelligence cannot repair the malfunction and cannot wake him, so Kemmings is doomed to remain conscious but paralyzed through the ship's entire ten-year-long journey. To maintain his sanity, the A.I. replays Kemmings's memories to him. But when this goes awry, the ship's A.I. asks Kemmings what he wants most -- and the answer is that Kemming wants the trip to be over and to arrive at his new home. The A.I. constructs such a scenario for Kemming and plays it to him over and over for the next ten years. When the ship finally arrives at its destination, Kemming cannot accept reality and believes his arrival to be yet another construction.

Like most of Philip K. Dick's work, I Hope I Shall Arrive Soon involves a questioning of what it is to be human and of what reality is. The story also has a theme of guilt, as the memories of the passenger are spoiled by the guilt he retains about his past actions. 

Short stories by Philip K. Dick
Existentialist short stories
1980 short stories
Works originally published in Playboy